Trigonotoma is a genus of beetles in the family Carabidae, containing the following species:

 Trigonotoma anthracina Dubault, Lassalle & Roux, 2008
 Trigonotoma aurifera Tschitscherine, 1900
 Trigonotoma baehri Kirschenhofer, 1997
 Trigonotoma bhamoensis Bates, 1889
 Trigonotoma buehleri Straneo, 1953
 Trigonotoma cauta Tschitscherine, 1900
 Trigonotoma chrysites Bates, 1892
 Trigonotoma comotti Gestro, 1883
 Trigonotoma concinna Castelnau, 1834
 Trigonotoma cylindriceps Straneo, 1985
 Trigonotoma dohrnii Chaudoir, 1852
 Trigonotoma funebris Tschitscherine, 1900
 Trigonotoma igneicollis Bates, 1892
 Trigonotoma indica Brulle, 1834
 Trigonotoma ioides Bates, 1892
 Trigonotoma kuntzeni Hubenthal, 1914
 Trigonotoma lamprodera Bates, 1892
 Trigonotoma laosensis Kirschenhofer, 2007
 Trigonotoma leotaudi Tschitscherine, 1900
 Trigonotoma lewisii Bates, 1873
 Trigonotoma loeffleri Kirschenhofer, 2007
 Trigonotoma lumawigi Straneo, 1987
 Trigonotoma luzonica Chaudoir, 1868
 Trigonotoma morvani Deuve & Lassalle, 1983
 Trigonotoma nepalensis Morvan, 1994
 Trigonotoma niasana Tschitscherine, 1898
 Trigonotoma nitidicollis Chaudoir, 1868
 Trigonotoma oberthueri Tschitscherine, 1894
 Trigonotoma ovalis Dubault, Lassalle & Roux, 2008
 Trigonotoma palavanica Tschitscherine, 1897
 Trigonotoma perraudieri Bates, 1889
 Trigonotoma peteli Castelnau, 1834
 Trigonotoma philippinica Straneo, 1967
 Trigonotoma psyche Tschitscherine, 1897
 Trigonotoma puella Tschitscherine, 1898
 Trigonotoma shillongensis Kirschenhofer, 2007
 Trigonotoma similis Chaudoir, 1868
 Trigonotoma submetallica Dubault, Lassalle & Roux, 2008
 Trigonotoma venus Tschitscherine, 1897
 Trigonotoma verberifera L.Schaufuss, 1887
 Trigonotoma wegneri Straneo, 1963

References

Pterostichinae